Rozelle was an electoral district of the Legislative Assembly in the Australian state of New South Wales, it was named after and including the Sydney suburb of Rozelle. It was created in the 1904 re-distribution of electorates following the 1903 New South Wales referendum, which required the number of members of the Legislative Assembly to be reduced from 125 to 90. It consisted of part of the abolished seat of Balmain South and part of Annandale. With the introduction of proportional representation, it was absorbed into the multi-member electorate of Balmain. It was recreated in 1927, but was abolished in 1930.

Members for Rozelle

Election results

References

Former electoral districts of New South Wales
Constituencies established in 1904
1904 establishments in Australia
Constituencies disestablished in 1920
1920 disestablishments in Australia
Constituencies established in 1927
1927 establishments in Australia
Constituencies disestablished in 1930
1930 disestablishments in Australia